Perlat is a village in the former municipality of Kthellë in the Lezhë County, northwestern Albania. At the 2015 local government reform it became part of the municipality Mirditë. The village is the largest in the former municipality.

Notable people 
Pjetër Perlati, commander of the League of Lezhë

References

Populated places in Mirditë
Villages in Lezhë County